Stade Alphonse Theis is a football stadium in Hesperange, in southern Luxembourg.  It is currently the home stadium of FC Swift Hesperange.  The stadium has a capacity of 3,058.

References
World Stadiums - Luxembourg
StadiumDB information

Alphonse Theis
Buildings and structures in Hesperange